Judo at the 2017 Central American Games was held at the Managua, Nicaragua from 6 to 8 December 2017.

Medalists

Men

Women

Medal table

References

External links
 

1st day – results
2nd day – results (video)
3rd day – results (video)

Central American Games, 2017
American Central Games